Hergest Ridge is the second studio album by English musician and songwriter Mike Oldfield, released on 28 August 1974 by Virgin Records. The unexpected commercial and critical success of his debut album Tubular Bells (1973) affected Oldfield, who decided against touring and avoided the press with his newfound fame. Instead, he retreated to Hergest Ridge on the England–Wales border and wrote the follow-up, which he recorded in 1974 at The Manor in Oxfordshire, with Tom Newman returning as co-producer. Similar to Oldfield's first, the album is a single composition split into two parts covering different moods and musical styles.

The album was No. 1 on the UK Albums Chart for three consecutive weeks before it was displaced by Tubular Bells, marking one of the few times an artist has overtaken themselves on the chart in this manner. In 2010, the album was reissued with new stereo and 5.1 surround sound mixes, bonus material, and new artwork.

Background and recording
After the release of his debut album Tubular Bells, Oldfield sought a countryside location to write a follow-up album. In early 1974 he drove around the West Country before turning north into Herefordshire. He spotted a house named The Beacon on the edge of Bradnor Hill that was for sale and received permission from Virgin Records co-owner Richard Branson to buy it.

Oldfield settled into his new home but felt unsure of his next career move. His contract with Virgin allowed him a £25 wage and continual offers added to the pressure of appearing in public, causing Oldfield to suffer from panic attacks. He lacked any solid ideas for new music and chose to perform simple undemanding Medieval tunes with folk musician Les Penning at Penrhos Court, a local restaurant, in return for free wine. With encouragement from Branson, Oldfield started to write a follow-up to Tubular Bells following the delivery of a Farfisa organ, 4-track TEAC tape machine, and a mixing desk to his house.

Oldfield felt that half of the good sections on the album were so detailed and buried in the mix, it called for listeners to play the album on a high quality record player. He stated, "I have to listen really hard to pick out something that I know that I'm proud that I did". The climax to the album is something that he was particularly happy with. Comparisons of the album to Tubular Bells irritated him because he considered it a more arranged and fully conceived work. In 1975, Oldfield reflected on Hergest Ridge and thought it contained "some excellent ideas" but its recording was rushed, which affected the performance.

After initial recording sessions at Basing Street Studios, London and Chipping Norton Studios, Oxfordshire were abandoned, Oldfield recorded Hergest Ridge in the spring of 1974 at The Manor near Shipton-on-Cherwell, Oxfordshire, with Tom Newman resuming his role as co-producer with Oldfield. The album was mixed at AIR Studios on London's Oxford Street.

Music
Similarly to Tubular Bells, the album is divided into two movements. Oldfield frequently superimposes layers of electric guitar recorded by first amplifying heavily (to achieve a sustained organ-like quality) and then reducing the volume greatly via use of the Glorfindel Box (a custom guitar effects unit housed in plywood, which was extremely unreliable in its operation; the unit was obtained from David Bedford, who had been given the box at a party by its creator.) The volume was reduced further using the compression channel from the Manor's mixing console, as had been done on Tubular Bells Part 2. Textures are extended further using various organ timbres and the use of voice as an instrument (the voice is never treated prominently and is deliberately reduced as much as possible and thus permitted largely for textural effect).

Versions 
Hergest Ridge was remixed in SQ system 4-channel quadraphonic sound by Oldfield in 1976 for the 4-LP set, Boxed. Following the creation of the remix, Oldfield stated that he wished for all future releases of the album to be derived from this new version. All CD releases have a stereo mix derived from the Boxed mix, as do most of the later pressings of LP and cassette. The original 1974 vinyl mix is now available on the 2010 reissue of the album, along with a 2010 remix.

An orchestral version of Hergest Ridge was arranged and conducted by David Bedford, who had previously undertaken the same tasks on The Orchestral Tubular Bells. It was performed live a number of times, and recorded for radio broadcast from concert performances twice, once in 1974 by the Royal Philharmonic Orchestra with Steve Hillage on guitar, and once in 1976 by the Scottish National Orchestra, again with Hillage on guitar. Andy Summers played on other performances that year. Parts of its performances were used in the NASA and Tony Palmer documentary The Space Movie.  it has not been officially released.

Reception

Paul Stump commented on Hergest Ridge in his 1997 History of Progressive Rock: "So how to follow Tubular Bells? Simple. Merely repeat its developmental techniques through new (but less inspired) sequences of tunes."

Hergest Ridge, the place 

Hergest Ridge on the England–Wales border is a popular holiday destination for Oldfield's fans, and the house where he lived at the time, The Beacon, is now a guest house. The cover photograph features scenery from Hergest Ridge, and was taken by Trevor Key; the Irish Wolfhound on the cover (and on the LP label) was named Bootleg.  Mike Oldfield himself can be heard pronouncing it in the song "On Horseback", which concludes "Part Two" of Ommadawn.

Although the album was written at The Beacon, it was, like Tubular Bells, recorded at Richard Branson's The Manor.

Track listing

Personnel 
Credits are adapted from the 1974 liner notes.

Musicians
Mike Oldfield – electric and acoustic guitars, bass guitar, glockenspiel, sleigh bells, mandolin, nutcracker, timpani, gong, Spanish guitar, Farfisa organ, Lowrey organ, GEM Gemini organ
June Whiting – oboe
Lindsay Cooper – oboe
Ted Hobart – trumpet
Terry Oldfield – flute
Chilli Charles – snare drum
Clodagh Simonds – vocals
Sally Oldfield – vocals
David Bedford – choir and strings conductor

Production
Mike Oldfield – production, engineering
Tom Newman – production and engineering assistant
Trevor Key – album cover
Bootleg – Irish wolfhound on the album cover

HDCD remastered reissue 
In 2000 Virgin re-released all of Oldfield's back catalogue, remastered in High Definition Compatible Digital, by Simon Heyworth at Chop 'em Out studios between March and April 2000, from the 1976 Boxed Quad mix. The album was re-released on 29 May 2000. HDCD is a patented process for delivering on CD the full richness and detail of the original microphone feed. Although a HDCD player is required to fully appreciate a HDCD recording, some improvement is still noticeable on normal CD players.

The "lyrics" in Part 2, are more easily heard in the remix, although attempts to deciphering them have failed. It seems that they are an example of Clodagh Simonds' skill in inventing nonsense lyrics, which she did again on Ommadawn, although for that album she also included some Irish Gaelic words.

Mercury Records reissue 
On 7 June 2010 the album was re-released by Mercury Records. This came as part of a deal in which Oldfield's Virgin albums were transferred to Universal's label. Bonus features for the release include a 2010 remix of the album and the original vinyl mix of the album. There is a single disc edition as well as a Deluxe Edition. Bonus tracks include "In Dulci Jubilo (For Maureen)" and "Spanish Tune". A 180 gram vinyl version was released as part of the Back to Black range.

The reissue features radically different artwork, which features a model glider and aerial photography based on Google Earth and Bluesky. According to the new liner notes, Oldfield was never entirely happy with the original album artwork and took this opportunity to commission a new cover.

There is also a limited edition box set of the album, comprising a deluxe edition, an LP and a framed, signed print of the album artwork. Only 250 copies were produced, which were sold through Mike Oldfield's official website. There are no un-signed variants.

The Japanese release uses the SHM-CD (Super High Material CD) manufacturing process.

Single disc edition 

 "Hergest Ridge {Part One}" (2010 stereo mix) – 19:21
 "Hergest Ridge {Part Two}" (2010 stereo mix) – 18:46
 "In Dulci Jubilo (For Maureen)" – 2:46
 "Spanish Tune" – 3:11

Back to Black vinyl edition 

 "Hergest Ridge {Part One}" (1974 stereo mix)
 "Hergest Ridge {Part Two}" (1974 stereo mix)

Limited edition 

Limited edition available through mikeoldfieldofficial.com, which contains the deluxe edition the vinyl edition and a numbered framed print of the cover artwork, signed by Mike Oldfield. Also includes Walking the Hergest Ridge booklet. Only 250 copies were available on pre-order prior to the release on 14 June 2010.

Digital edition 

 "Hergest Ridge {Part One}" (2010 stereo mix)
 "Hergest Ridge {Part Two}" (2010 stereo mix)
 "Hergest Ridge {Part One}" (1974 stereo mix)
 "Hergest Ridge {Part Two}" (1974 stereo mix)
 "Hergest Ridge {Part One}" (1974 demo recordings)
 "Hergest Ridge (Part Two)" (1974 demo recordings)

Deluxe edition 

CD 1
 "Hergest Ridge {Part One}" (2010 stereo mix) – 19:21
 "Hergest Ridge {Part Two}" (2010 stereo mix) – 18:46
 "In Dulci Jubilo (For Maureen)" – 2:46
 "Spanish Tune" – 3:11

CD 2
 "Hergest Ridge {Part One}" (1974 stereo mix) – 21:32
 "Hergest Ridge {Part Two}" (1974 stereo mix) – 18:40
 "Hergest Ridge {Part One}" (1974 demo recordings) – 20:21
 "Hergest Ridge {Part Two}" (1974 demo recordings) – 18:13

DVD
 "Hergest Ridge {Part One}" (2010 5.1 surround mix)
 "Hergest Ridge {Part Two}" (2010 5.1 surround mix)

Charts 
Hergest Ridge was the UK's number one album in the week ending 14 September 1974 and remained so for three weeks until being knocked out of the spot by its predecessor Tubular Bells. Oldfield is thus one of only a few artists (among whom are The Beatles and Bob Dylan) to have swapped number one albums in this manner.

In 1975, Rolling Stone reported that 2 million copies of the album had been sold.

Certifications and sales

References

External links 
 Mike Oldfield Discography – Hergest Ridge at Tubular.net
 MikeOldfieldOfficial.com
 Hergest Ridge and Ommadawn at Universal's Mike Oldfield store

Mike Oldfield albums
1974 albums
Instrumental albums
Progressive rock albums by British artists
Virgin Records albums
Albums produced by Tom Newman (musician)